Tarzan and the Forbidden City is a novel by American writer Edgar Rice Burroughs, the twentieth in his series of twenty-four books about the title character Tarzan.

Plot summary

A young man named Brian Gregory has disappeared in Africa, looking for the fabled Father of Diamonds; his father and sister want to go rescue him, and they can only enlist Tarzan's help because they know Captain Paul D`Arnot. By chance, Tarzan and Brian are lookalike, thus making some vile scoundrels to think Tarzan is Brian. They are also heading out after the big old diamond.
The Forbidden city is again in a secret valley, with two cities Ashair and Thobos in war, because of the Father of Diamonds. 
Tarzan has to fight many times against different foes, once even a mansize unicorn seahorse!

Media adaptations
The book has been adapted into the radio series [[Tarzan and the Diamond of Ashair]], and the comic form by Gold Key Comics in Tarzan nos. 190-191, dated October–November 1970, with a script by Gaylord DuBois and art by Paul Norris and Nat Edson.

It was also the basis for an episode of the Filmation Tarzan, Lord of the Jungle animated cartoon in 1976, and an episode of Tarzan: The Epic Adventures'' in 1997.

Sources

External links
 
 ERBzine.com Illustrated Bibliography entry for Edgar Rice Burroughs' Tarzan and the Forbidden City
Edgar Rice Burroughs Summary Project page for Tarzan and the Forbidden City

1938 American novels
1938 fantasy novels
Tarzan novels by Edgar Rice Burroughs